In the Pink of Condition is the third studio album by Welsh musician H. Hawkline. It was released on 3 February 2015 under Heavenly Recordings.

The album was nominated for the 2014-2015 Welsh Music Prize.

Critical reception
In the Pink of Condition  was met with "universal acclaim" reviews from critics. At Metacritic, which assigns a weighted average rating out of 100 to reviews from mainstream publications, this release received an average score of 82, based on 6 reviews.

Track listing

References

2015 albums
Heavenly Recordings albums
Albums produced by Cate Le Bon